Jack Conway may refer to:
 Jack Conway (baseball) (1918–1993), American baseball player
 Jack Conway (filmmaker) (1887–1952), American film producer and director
 Jack Conway (footballer) (1867–1949), Australian rules footballer
 Jack Conway (politician) (born 1969), former Attorney General of Kentucky
 Jack T. Conway (1918–1998), American labor unionist

See also
 John Conway (disambiguation)